This is a list of London School of Hygiene & Tropical Medicine people, including former students and members of faculty.

Notable alumni 

Notable alumni of the School include:

Notable current and former academic staff

Deans and directors 

Ref

References

Lists of people by university or college in London
People associated with the London School of Hygiene & Tropical Medicine